The Broadway Theatre opened in 1929 in downtown Mount Pleasant, Michigan and features concerts, classic films and the local Community Theater troupe, the Broadway Players. It has 480 seats.

See also

Movie palaces list

References

External links
 http://www.friendsofthebroadway.org

Theatres in Michigan
Theatres completed in 1929
Buildings and structures in Isabella County, Michigan
Tourist attractions in Isabella County, Michigan
Event venues established in 1929
1929 establishments in Michigan